is a passenger railway station in the city of Shimotsuma, Ibaraki Prefecture, Japan operated by the private railway company Kantō Railway.

Lines

Station layout
The station consists of two opposed side platforms  connected to the station building by a level crossing. The station is unattended.

Platforms

Adjacent stations

History
Daihō Station was opened in 1917 as a station on the Jōsō Railroad, which became the Kantō Railway in 1965. The station building was rebuilt in 2005.

Passenger statistics
In fiscal 2017, the station was used by an average of 96 passengers daily (boarding passengers only).

Surrounding area
 Daihō Post Office
 Daihō Hachiman-gu

See also
 List of railway stations in Japan

References

External links

 Kantō Railway Station Information 

Railway stations in Ibaraki Prefecture
Railway stations in Japan opened in 1917
Shimotsuma, Ibaraki